Elettaria ensal is a monocotyledonous plant species that was first described by Joseph Gaertner, and got its current name from Bartholomeusz Aristides Abeywickrama. Elettaria ensal is part of the genus Elettaria and the family Zingiberaceae.

References 

Alpinioideae